The 2022 FIBA U18 European Championship Division C was the 16th edition of the Division C of the FIBA U18 European Championship, the third tier of the European under-18 basketball championship. It was played from 24 to 31 July 2022 in Serravalle, San Marino. Albania men's national under-18 basketball team won the tournament.

Participating teams

  (24th place, 2019 FIBA U18 European Championship Division B)

First round
The draw of the first round was held on 15 February 2022 in Freising, Germany.

In the first round, the teams were drawn into two groups of five. The first two teams from each group advance to the semifinals; the third and fourth teams advance to the 5th–8th place playoffs; the last teams will play the 9th place match.

Group A

Group B

9th place match

5th–8th place playoffs

5th–8th place semifinals

7th place match

5th place match

Championship playoffs

Semifinals

3rd place match

Final

Final standings

References

FIBA U18 European Championship Division C
2022–23 in European basketball
FIBA U18
FIBA
Sports competitions in San Marino